The Tranearth Group is a Silurian lithostratigraphic group (a sequence of rock strata) in the southern Lake District and Howgill Fells of the Pennines of northern England. The name is derived from the locality of Tranearth near Torver in Cumbria. The Group is included within the Windermere Supergroup. It comprises laminated hemipelagites and siltstones and some sandstones and limestone which achieve a thickness of between 500 and 1000m. It is divided into a lower Brathay Formation which is overlain by the Birk Riggs Formation (not present in the Howgills) and then by an upper Coldwell Formation.

References

 

Silurian System of Europe
Geology of England
Geological groups of the United Kingdom
Geologic formations of the United Kingdom